The Goodbye Girl is a musical with a book by Neil Simon, lyrics by David Zippel, and music by Marvin Hamlisch, based on Simon's original screenplay for the 1977 film of the same name.

Production history

Out-of-town tryouts 

The Goodbye Girl opened in out-of-town tryouts at the Shubert Theatre in Chicago, from December 29, 1992 to January 30, 1993. The director, Gene Saks, was fired during the Chicago tryouts and replaced by Michael Kidd. During the run, producers created a new opening song for Bernadette Peters as Paula and Tammy Minoff as her daughter Lucy. "An exuberant song about their hoped-for move to California from New York City, it's meant to help Paula lighten up; in the first act, she has been perceived as a drip." Ticket sales were "brisk" for the Chicago run and the musical had a $10 million advance for Broadway.

Broadway 

The musical, directed by Michael Kidd and choreographed by Graciela Daniele, opened on Broadway at the Marquis Theatre on March 4, 1993 and closed on August 15, 1993, after 188 performances and 23 previews. The opening cast included Bernadette Peters as Paula McFadden and Martin Short as Elliot Garfield, with Carol Woods as Mrs. Crosby, Susann Fletcher as Donna Douglas, Tammy Minoff as Lucy, Lisa Molina as Melanie and Erin Torpey as Cynthia. This musical marked Martin Short's Broadway debut.

Illinois 

The musical was produced at the Marriott Theatre, Lincolnshire, Illinois, in February through April 1994. This version featured some modifications by lyricist David Zippel, who also co-directed the production. This represents the version preferred by the authors and is currently licensed by the licensing agent, MTI.

London 

After several previews, a revised version (with new lyrics by Don Black) opened on April 17, 1997 at the Albery Theatre in the West End, and closed on June 28, 1997. It starred Gary Wilmot and Ann Crumb. The new lyrics in this production were not well received. The production, produced by Paul Elliott, directed by Rob Bettinson and choreographed by Tudor Davies, also featured Angela Avrili, Carol Ball, Cliff Brayshaw, Kyle Dadd, Steve Elias, Lucy Evans, Josefina Gabrielle, Adrian Goodfellow, Rachel Harris, Nicola Hughes, Michael Mears, Hayley Newton, Richard Pettyfer, Mary Savva, Wesley James Smith, Mason Taylor, Dina Tree, Jodie Lee Wilde and Shezwae Powell.

UK Tour 

Wilmot subsequently toured the UK in 1997 and 1998 opposite Marti Webb. Sophie McShera alternated with Hannah Chick in the role of Lucy, Hope Augustus played the landlady, and Steve Elias and West End veteran Katie Verner also appeared.

Plot
Egotistical actor Elliot Garfield sublets a friend's Manhattan apartment only to discover it is still occupied by his friend's ex-girlfriend Paula, a former dancer, and her precocious pre-teen daughter Lucy. Initially suspicious and antagonistic, Elliot and Paula arrive at an uneasy truce. Paula, fed up with being hurt by boyfriend-actors, rashly vows never to become involved again ("No More"), while Elliot sets down the rules for the living arrangements ("My Rules").  Paula decides to return to work as a dancer, but during dance class finds it difficult ("A Beat Behind").

While attempting to cohabit as peacefully as possible, despite their differences of opinion and temperament, Elliot and Paula find themselves attracted to each other ("Paula (An Improvised Love Song)"). Although Elliot finds a job out-of-town, Paula realizes that this is the true love she has been seeking, and they reach a happy ending ("What a Guy").

Recordings
Original cast recordings for both the Broadway and West End productions have been released.
In his review of the London cast recording, Ken Mandelbaum noted that "The London Goodbye Girl is perhaps the sharpest example to date of an unnecessary revision. The skimpier new score isn't bad, but in no way does it improve upon what was there (the loss of all three of Peters' solos is particularly inexplicable)."

Songs

Act I
 This Is as Good as It Gets – Paula and Lucy
 No More – Paula
 A Beat Behind – Paula, Billy and Ensemble
 This Is as Good as It Gets (Reprise) – Lucy, Melanie and Cynthia
 My Rules – Elliot and Paula
 Good News, Bad News – Elliot, Paula and Lucy
 Footsteps – Paula and Lucy
 How Can I Win? – Paula
 Richard Interred – Elliot, Paula, Lucy, Mark, Mrs. Crosby, Donna and Ensemble

Act II
 How Can I Win? (Reprise) – Paula
 Good News, Bad News (Reprise) – Elliot
 Too Good to Be Bad – Paula, Donna and Jenna
 2 Good 2 Be Bad – Mrs. Crosby
 Who Would've Thought? – Paula, Elliot, Lucy, Melanie and Cynthia
 Paula (An Improvised Love Song) – Elliot and Paula
 Who Would've Thought? (Reprise) – Lucy, Melanie and Cynthia
 I Think I Can Play This Part – Elliot
 Jump for Joy – Paula and Ensemble
 What a Guy – Paula
 Finale – Paula, Elliot and Lucy

Critical response
Variety wrote in the review of the out-of-town tryout in Chicago: "There's some good news on the way to Broadway...Among the show's various virtues, the most surprising and wonderful is Martin Short...Peters is well cast as Paula, though she still seems to be finding her way into the role of the dancer...Marvin Hamlisch's score isn't likely to go down as one of the most memorable in Broadway history, but coupled with David Zippel's ingenious lyrics, it becomes a great asset."

Despite major changes, before the New York opening, reviews did not improve.  Frank Rich in The New York Times wrote: "Even if you don't share my conviction that Bernadette Peters and Martin Short are among the most winning of performers, you still might admire how they play the losing hand they've been dealt in 'The Goodbye Girl.'" Time wrote "THE BOTTOM LINE: Big stars, boffo story, but bad judgments turn a much anticipated show into an amiable disappointment."

According to Ken Bloom, "reviews were tepid, as was audience reaction. What should have been a major success had had trouble on the road, and a few key production staff were replaced prior to Broadway."

Awards and nominations

Original Broadway production

References

London listing

External links

MTI Shows detailed plot and production information

1993 musicals
Broadway musicals
Musicals based on films
Plays set in New York City
Musicals by Marvin Hamlisch
Musicals by David Zippel
Musicals by Neil Simon